Berks County Football Club is a football club based in Binfield, England.

History
Berks County were founded in 2009 as a youth club by chairman Richard Lloyd. In 2014, following a merger between Bracknell Rovers and Sunninghill Saints, a senior team was formed, being placed in the Thames Valley Premier League. In 2021, the club was admitted into the Combined Counties League Division One. Berks County entered the FA Vase for the first time in 2021–22.

Ground
The club currently groundshare with Binfield at Hill Farm Lane.

References

Association football clubs established in 2009
2009 establishments in England
Football clubs in England
Football clubs in Berkshire
Thames Valley Premier Football League
Combined Counties Football League